The Mexican Geological Survey is an agency of the Mexican government; its mission includes mapping and mining consultation.

History 
The Mexican Geological Survey originated as the Directing Committee for Mexican Mineral Resource Research, established in 1944, which published bulletins on the exploration of mineral deposits.  In 1949, the organization changed its name to the National Research Institute for Mineral Resources, and in 1955 it became the Non-Renewable Natural Resources Council.  Twenty years after, in 1975, the agency became known as the Mexican Resources Council.  In 2005, the title was modified to its present listing as the Mexican Geological Survey.

Regional Offices
The agency is divided into 7 regional offices.  Each office serves one or more states as listed below:
 North; Chihuahua
 Central-North; Durango, Zacatecas, Aguascalientes, Coahuila
 Northwest; Sonora, Baja California
 Central-Western; Jalisco, Michoacán, Colima, Guanajuato, Querétaro, México, Federal District
 Central; San Luis Potosí, Nuevo León, Tamaulipas, Hidalgo
 South; Oaxaca, Guerrero, Morelos, Puebla, Tlaxcala, Veracruz, Tabasco, Chiapas, Campeche, Yucatán, Quintana Roo
 West; Sinaloa, Baja California Sur, Nayarit

GeoInfoMex 
The Mexican Geological Survey developed a database containing geological mining exploration maps at scales of 1:250,000, and 1:50,000. The database was launched in 2003 and contains information of all geological and geochemical maps. The agency hosts and maintains a publicly accessible web application, named GeoInfoMex, which allows users to query the Mexican Geological Survey database via a graphical interface. GeoInfoMex features a map of Mexico, containing levels of topics that can be searched and explored, including criterion such as: geochemistry, geophysics, metallurgy, mineral resources, and radiometric dating.

References

National geological agencies
Geology of Mexico
Science and technology in Mexico
Mining in Mexico